Zerilli is a surname. Notable people with the surname include: 

Anna Zerilli, American college football player
Anthony Joseph Zerilli (1927–2015), Italian-American mobster 
Joseph Zerilli (1897–1977), Italian-American mobster

See also
Perilli

Italian-language surnames